David Rose may refer to:

Business
 David Rose (real estate developer) (1892–1986), American real estate developer and philanthropist
 David L. Rose (born 1967), American business executive and scientist at MIT Media Lab
 David S. Rose (born 1957), American technology entrepreneur and angel investor

Entertainment
 David Rose (artist) (1910–2006), American artist
 David Rose (songwriter) (1910–1990), American songwriter, composer, arranger and orchestra leader
 David Rose (producer) (1924–2017), British television producer and editor
 David Rose, American actor and second male lead in British horror-comedy The Headless Ghost (1959)
 David Rose (1931–2004), British actor, brother of actor Clifford Rose
 David Rose (1946–1994), American violinist and songwriter, part of French project Blue Rose, known for the 1982 title Don't you know

Politics
 David Rose (Guyanese politician) (1923–1969), Governor-General of Guyana
 David Rose (UK politician), Northern Irish unionist politician
 David Stuart Rose (1856–1932), mayor of Milwaukee, Wisconsin, US

Sports
 Dave Rose (basketball) (born 1957), head basketball coach at Brigham Young University
 David Rose (rugby) (1931–2021), Scottish rugby union and Great Britain rugby league footballer
 David Rose (club secretary) (born 1940s), football club secretary of Ipswich Town F.C.

Others
 David A. Rose (1906–1995), American lawyer and judge who served in the Massachusetts state courts
 David Rose (journalist) (born 1959), British writer and journalist
 David J. Rose (1922–1985), professor of nuclear engineering
 David Rose (bishop) (1913–1997), American prelate
David Rose (Schitt's Creek), character on the CBC and Pop TV sitcom Schitt's Creek